Baku Kala Air Base is a military airbase in Baku (also known as Bakü or Baki), the capital of Azerbaijan.

After the collapse of the USSR military, aircraft was relocated to airfields in Russia, and the Azerbaijani Air Force used the airport. Currently, the airport is based 843rd Mixed Aviation Regiment BBC Azerbaijan.

Facilities

See also
List of airports in Azerbaijan

References

Airports in Azerbaijan
Soviet Air Force bases
Azerbaijani Air Force bases
Transport in Baku